The Box is a British music television channel owned and operated by Channel Four Television Corporation. It primarily broadcasts music videos and music-related programmes.

History
The Box was brought to the United Kingdom by Vincent Monsey and his partner Liz Laskowski, who discovered the American music video channel in Miami in 1991, when it was then known as The Jukebox Network. The UK company, Video Jukebox Network International Limited, was formed in 1991 and The Box was launched the following year in April 1992 during the early days of cable television. The Box was carried by four operators UA, Telewest in London and Bristol, Nynex in the south of England, and Videotron, which is also based in London.

Over the next few years, The Box was rolled out on a regional basis across all of the United Kingdom's cable system available and, eventually, onto Sky Digital in 1998. The Box was also broadcast on the Astra Satellite between 2 am and 6 am during the downtime of Granada Plus and Men & Motors. From 1999, all the regional versions of The Box were shut down and replaced with a single UK version.

Ticketmaster Inc. briefly owned 50% of the company (Box Television Ltd) before becoming a public company on the FTSE. EMAP took ownership of these shares in 1997, and purchased the shareholding held by the US company VJN Inc, which had then become TCI Music and then Liberty Digital. The US version of the channel was sold to MTVN in 2000. EMAP retained ownership, receiving profits made from music video selections, which are made by the viewers using premium rate phone lines, as well as the small fees from BSkyB for being an encrypted channel. Each week, a new playlist would be released and would generally contain new or current music videos. In its earlier years, the playlist was published on teletext and the channel's website. Today, The Box now operates from a pre-programmed playlist and does not include video selection jukeboxes.

In July 2007, Channel Four Television Corporation acquired 50% of Box Television, before EMAP's remaining 50% in the company was sold to Bauer Media Group in January 2008. In 2019 Channel 4 took full ownership of the company, now known as The Box Plus Network.

On 2 April 2013, all Box Television channels went free-to-air on satellite, apart from 4Music which went free-to-view. As a result, the channels were removed from the Sky EPG in Ireland. The Box was added to the Freesat EPG on 15 April 2013, alongside three other Box Television channels. The Box and its sister channels (except 4Music) returned to Freesat on 8 December 2021 alongside C4 HD.

Each year on 1 November, the channel temporary rebrands as "BoXmas", playing Christmas hits. It also plays regular hits during post-Christmas days.

On the evening of Saturday 25 September 2021, transmission of channels operated by Channel 4 was impacted by the activation of a fire suppressant system at the premises of Red Bee Media. This resulted in The Box being simulcast on Freeview in the place of 4Music (also known for broadcasting comedy and reality shows in the afternoon and evening) and the channel being broadcast in the place of 4Music, Kerrang! and Magic on satellite and cable.

On 23 August 2022, the On-Screen Graphics of The Box were revised. The new graphics feature a larger logo, modified font and different animations when showing Artist/Song titles and transitions.

Format

The channel is well known for its "First Play" feature, where many videos often make their UK or world premiere. This new music is often shown through the "Box Fresh" show. Most notably, The Box were recognized for the particular force behind the huge success of Spice Girls' 1996 hit "Wannabe", playing their first single months before its official release date.

Notably, for a brief period in late 1999 and early 2000, there was a trend of artists name checking The Box in their music videos, though the practice wasn't widespread. In most cases, this was simply an insertion of the logo at some point in the regular video, however in a few cases, the channel was actually name checked by the artists themselves. The most notable example of this is the video for the S Club 7 song "S Club Party", which also had an extended opening and closing never seen on other music channels.

Programming
Hot Hits & New Vids (formerly known as Chart Hits & New Vids) – Current hits and music videos.
Hotmix – Tracks from the last few years. The songs are usually cut down and are edited to flow smoothly into the next track. 
UK Hotlist Top 20 & Top 40 – The 20 and 40 most streamed tracks on Spotify in the last week, counted down by Will Best.
The UK Music Video Chart – Data supplied by YouTube, the UKMVC supplies you with the top 30 most watched music videos of the week.
Hitlist – Current hits.
VOTW – Check out The Box Plus Network's Video of the Week!
The Fresh List – New and recurrent videos from new and established artists
The Big Monthly Round Up Lucy Jones as she round ups the biggest music telly and pop culture gossip of the month!
Saturday Night Feels – Saturday night is on! Join us for all the biggest dance floor bangers to round off the week

Former logos

References

External links

Channel 4 television channels
Music video networks in the United Kingdom
Television channels and stations established in 1992